The 2012 O'Byrne Cup was a Gaelic football competition played by the teams of Leinster GAA. The competition differs from the Leinster Senior Football Championship as it also features further education colleges and the winning team does not progress to another tournament at All-Ireland level. The winners of the 2011 O'Byrne Cup were Kildare. The O'Byrne Cup began on 8 January 2012. Prior to the start of the competition, Kilkenny announced that they would not be participating in the competition this year.

O'Byrne Cup

First round
The first round winners Meath, DCU, Longford, Kildare, Offaly, Dublin and UCD went on to qualify for the quarter finals of the tournament. The losers of the first round went on to the O'Byrne Shield quarter finals.  All the first round matches took place on 8 January 2012.

Quarter-finals

Semi-finals

Final
The final of the O'Byrne Cup was originally supposed to take place on 29 January 2012.  However, due to the venue (St Conleth's Park) being waterlogged, it was postponed. The new date was Friday 17 February in Portlaoise.

O'Byrne Shield
The O'Byrne Shield consists of the 7 losing teams from the first round of the O'Byrne Cup.

Quarter-finals

Semi-finals

Final

See also
 2012 Dr McKenna Cup

References

2012
2012 in Gaelic football
January 2012 sports events in Europe